Urogonodes macrura is a moth in the family Drepanidae. It was described by Warren in 1923. It is found in New Guinea, where it is probably restricted to higher mountains.

It is a variable species.

References

Moths described in 1923
Drepaninae